Adam Michael Flagler (born December 1, 1999) is an American college basketball player for the Baylor Bears of the Big 12 Conference. He previously played for the Presbyterian Blue Hose.

High school career
Flagler grew up playing baseball, football and basketball. He played basketball at Duluth High School in Duluth, Georgia. Flagler left as the school's all-time leader in points (1,300) and three-pointers (227). He was a two-time all-county selection. He committed to playing college basketball for Presbyterian, the only NCAA Division I program to offer him a scholarship.

College career
On November 19, 2018, Flagler scored a career-high 29 points, making seven three-pointers, in an 80–65 loss to UCLA. As a freshman at Presbyterian, he averaged 15.9 points and 3.4 rebounds per game, scoring the most points by a freshman in program Division I history. Flagler earned Big South Freshman of the Year honors and was a five-time Big South Freshman of the Week, a conference record. After the offseason departure of head coach Dustin Kerns, he transferred to Baylor and sat out for one year due to transfer rules. During his redshirt year, Flagler improved his all-around game by practicing against Jared Butler, Davion Mitchell and MaCio Teague. As a sophomore in 2021, he assumed a sixth man role for Baylor, which finished with a 28–2 record and won the first National Championship in school history. Flagler averaged 9.1 points, 2.3 rebounds, and 1.4 assists per game. On February 19, 2022, he was ruled out due to a knee injury. Flagler was named to the Second Team All-Big 12. He averaged 13.8 points and 3.0 assists per game. Following the season, Flagler declared for the 2022 NBA draft, before returning to Baylor. As a senior, he was named to the First Team All-Big 12.

Career statistics

College

|-
| style="text-align:left;"| 2018–19
| style="text-align:left;"| Presbyterian
| 36 || 36 || 30.7 || .438 || .386 || .835 || 3.4 || 1.3 || .8 || .3 || 15.9
|-
| style="text-align:left;"| 2019–20
| style="text-align:left;"| Baylor
| style="text-align:center;" colspan="11"|  Redshirt
|-
| style="text-align:left;"| 2020–21
| style="text-align:left;"| Baylor
| 28 || 0 || 22.8 || .454 || .434 || .872 || 2.3 || 1.4 || .9 || .0 || 9.1
|-
| style="text-align:left;"| 2021–22
| style="text-align:left;"| Baylor
| 31 || 31 || 30.7 || .438 || .387 || .741 || 2.2 || 3.0 || 1.1 || .1 || 13.8
|- class="sortbottom"
| style="text-align:center;" colspan="2"| Career
| 95 || 67 || 28.4 || .441 || .395 || .817 || 2.7 || 1.9 || .9 || .1 || 13.2

Personal life
Flagler's older brother, DuVaughn, played college football as a wide receiver at Gardner–Webb and is an elementary school principal. Another older brother, Alex, played college basketball at Coker College and Cumberland University.

References

External links
Baylor Bears bio
Presbyterian Blue Hose bio

1999 births
Living people
American men's basketball players
Basketball players from Georgia (U.S. state)
Baylor Bears men's basketball players
People from Duluth, Georgia
Presbyterian Blue Hose men's basketball players
Shooting guards